Kenson Casimir is a Saint Lucian politician, former sports broadcaster and journalist. Casimir serves as Minister for Youth Development and Sports. He was the endorsed Saint Lucia Labour Party candidate for the constituency of Gros Islet. Casimir claimed his spot in the dubbed landslide victory for the Saint Lucia Labour Party in the 2021 Saint Lucian General Election. Casimir represents the Gros Islet constituency in the House of Assembly.

Post career 
Casimir was a sports broadcaster and journalist. He was the sports anchor at MBC Television. Casimir was a track and field athlete as well as a cricketer. Casimir was a teacher, lecturer and a youth and sports officer.

Education 
Casimir attended the Leon Hess Comprehensive Secondary School. He later received an Academic Award for Sociology in the Sir Arthur Lewis Graduating Class of 2006. He went on to receive first class honours at Grambling State University obtaining his Bachelor’s Degree in Business Management and Master’s Degree in Mass Communication. Casimir holds several certifications in Human Resource Management at Rajastan Institute of Technology and Applied Man Power Planning at Delhi Institute of Technology which he pursued in India.

References

External links 

 Kenson Casimir profile at the Saint Lucia Labour Party's website.

Members of the House of Assembly of Saint Lucia
Saint Lucia Labour Party politicians
Living people
Government ministers of Saint Lucia
Sports commentators
21st-century Saint Lucian politicians
Year of birth missing (living people)